Seaton Delaval railway station served the village of Seaton Delaval in Northumberland, North East England, from 1841 to 1965 on what became part of the Blyth and Tyne Railway. The construction of a new station has been proposed nearby as part of the Northumberland Line project.

History 
The station opened on 28 August 1841 by the Blyth, Seghill and Percy Main Railway (a predecessor of the B&TR). The station was situated on the south side of the Station Road (A192) bridge. After the footbridge subsided in 1940 due to a wartime barricade, all of the trains used the down platform. The principal goods traffic was bricks; this ceased in 1963. The station was closed to passengers on 2 November 1964 27 June 1964 and closed completely on 7 June 1965.

Reopening proposals
Proposals to reintroduce passenger rail services to the currently freight-only section of the former Blyth and Tyne Railway system have been discussed since the 1990s.

In the early 2010s, Northumberland County Council became interested in the proposals, commissioning Network Rail to complete a GRIP 1 study to examine the best options for the scheme in June 2013. This report was published in March 2014 and was followed in June 2015 with the commissioning of a more detailed GRIP 2 study at a cost of £850,000. The study suggested that due to the short distance between the former stations at Seaton Delaval and  only one, rather than both, should be reopened.

Despite a change in the political leadership of Northumberland County Council following the 2017 local elections the authority continued to develop the project, encouraged by the Department for Transport's November 2017 report, A Strategic Vision for Rail, which named the line as a possible candidate for a future reintroduction of passenger services. Consequentially, NCC commissioned a further interim study in November 2017 (dubbed GRIP 2B) to determine whether high costs and long timescales identified in the GRIP 2 Study could be reduced by reducing the initial scope of the project, but the report failed to deliver on this.

Nonetheless, the county council has continued to develop the project, hiring AECOM and SCL Rail as contractors to develop the scheme on their behalf in 2018 and allocating an additional £3.46 million in funding for a further business case and detailed design study (equivalent to GRIP 3) in February 2019. Revised plans were revealed in July 2019 which were reduced in scope from the 2016 GRIP 2 study and proposed 4-phase project to reduce the initial cost of the scheme. The revised plans appear to suggest that Seaton Delaval, rather than Seghill, had been selected for reopening but, even on its own, Seaton Delaval was to be excluded from the initial £90 million phase  and was only to be reopened during Phase 2 of the project. In Phase 4 it was proposed to add a passing loop in the vicinity of the station to enable the introduction of a half-hourly passenger train service. However, in August 2020, it was reported that these four proposed phases might be merged into a single one.

The North East Joint Transport Committee's bid for £377 million of funding from the UK Government's £1.28 billion Transforming Cities Fund, submitted on 20 June 2019, includes £99 million to fund the reintroduction of passenger services between Newcastle and Ashington, while further work is ongoing to secure additional public and private investment for the project.

The Department for Transport allocated an initial grant of £1.5 million towards the project costs in January 2020 which was supplemented by an allocation of £10 million of funds from Northumberland County Council the following month. This funding enabled AECOM to begin detailed on-site ground investigation works in October 2020. The allocation of a further £34 million of UK Government funding for the project in January 2021 enables the necessary land to be purchased, detailed designs to be prepared and some early preparatory and site works to begin. In January 2021, it was anticipated that the UK Government would fund the remainder of the project cost, estimated at £166 million as of January 2021, once the final phase of design works were completed. However, in April 2021, it was reported that government officials were seeking to reduce the cost of the project as part of the Department for Transport's Project SPEED initiative. It was reported that the cost-saving measures under consideration included and cutting initial service frequencies from two to one trains per hour and dropping the proposed Blyth Bebside station from initial project scope (although the latter option was later publicly ruled out by Minister for Railways Chris Heaton-Harris).

A planning application for the proposed new station at Seaton Delaval was submitted to Northumberland County Council on 3 June 2021. The submitted planning documents indicate that the new station will have a single  platform, located on the southeastern side of the remaining single line a short distance to the southwest of the site of the previous station's platforms. The station will be served by a new 284 space car park, accessed via a dedicated access road off of the A192 road, as well as a new segregated cycleway and footpaths.

Northumberland County Council submitted a Transport and Works Act Order application to the Secretary of State for Transport Grant Shapps on 26 May 2021, under which they would be conferred certain additional powers deemed necessary for the new stations to be constructed and the line upgraded to carry regular passenger services.  If approved, the new Seaton Delaval station will be constructed by the project's primary construction contractor, Morgan Sindall.  It is anticipated that the main construction phase could begin in early 2022, enabling an opening date in 2024.

References

Sources

External links 

Disused railway stations in Northumberland
Former North Eastern Railway (UK) stations
Railway stations in Great Britain opened in 1841
Railway stations in Great Britain closed in 1964
1841 establishments in England
1965 disestablishments in England
Beeching closures in England
Proposed railway stations in England